Diana Antonova (born January 17, 1993) is a Russian water polo player. At the 2012 Summer Olympics, she competed for the Russia women's national water polo team in the women's event.

References

Russian female water polo players
1993 births
Living people
Olympic water polo players of Russia
Water polo players at the 2012 Summer Olympics
Universiade medalists in water polo
Universiade bronze medalists for Russia
Medalists at the 2011 Summer Universiade
Medalists at the 2013 Summer Universiade
21st-century Russian women